Komren (Serbian Cyrillic: Koмpeн) is a neighborhood of the city of Niš, Serbia. It is located in Niš municipalities of Crveni Krst

Location
Komren is in the north-west outskirts of Niš. It is flat and bordered on the east by the hill Vinik, on the south by the Industrial Zone. On the west is located the city's main airport, Airport Constantine the Great.

History
Before Second World War, Komren was the area surrounding two villages: Gornji Komren and Donji Komren. After Second World War, development of near-by steel and tobacco industries and lack of proper public commuting for workers led to heavy migration into surrounding areas. New settlements that have emerged as expansion of original settlements were Novi Komren (suburb: Ratko Jović) and Naselje Donji Komren (suburb: Branko Bjegović). All of the Komren neighborhoods are now incorporated into the Niš urban area

Characteristics
The neighborhood is partly industrial and partly residential. The Komren neighborhood consists of:

Branko Bjegović,

Donji Komren,

Gornji Komren.

Future development
City government reserved the area in the neighborhood bordered on the east by the hill Vinik for future Free custom zone. The city government has announced the working project of construction of a new retail and entertainment complex in this neighborhood.

References

Neighborhoods of Niš